The following lists events that happened during 1944 in the Union of Soviet Socialist Republics.

Incumbents
General Secretary of the Communist Party of the Soviet Union – Joseph Stalin
Chairman of the Presidium of the Supreme Soviet of the Soviet Union – Mikhail Kalinin
Chairman of the Council of People's Commissars of the Soviet Union – Joseph Stalin

Events
 January 14 – WWII: Soviet troops start the offensive at Leningrad and Novgorod.
 January 17 – WWII: Soviet Union ceases production of the Mosin–Nagant 1891/30 sniper rifle.
 January 29 – WWII: Koniuchy massacre: Soviet and Jewish partisans kill at least 38 villagers in Koniuchy, Poland (modern-day Kaniūkai, Lithuania).
 March 6 – WWII: Soviet Army planes attack Narva, Estonia, destroying almost the entire baroque old town.
 March 9 – WWII: Soviet Army planes attack Tallinn, Estonia, killing 757 and leaving 25,000 homeless.
 March 15 – Soviet Union introduces new anthem, replacing The Internationale.
 May 9 – WWII: In the Ukrainian city of Sevastopol, Soviet troops completely drive out German forces.
 May 12 – WWII: Soviet troops finalize the liberation of the Crimea.
 May 18 – WWII: Deportation of the Crimean Tatars by the government of the Soviet Union.
 June 9 – WWII: Soviet leader Joseph Stalin launches the Vyborg–Petrozavodsk Offensive against Finland, with the intent of defeating Finland before pushing for Berlin.
 June 22 – WWII: Operation Bagration: A general attack by Soviet forces clears the German forces from Belarus, resulting in the destruction of German Army Group Centre, possibly the greatest defeat of the Wehrmacht during WWII.
 June 25 – WWII: The Battle of Tali-Ihantala (the largest battle ever in the Nordic countries) begins between Finnish and Soviet troops. Finland is able to resist the attack and thus manages to remain an independent nation.
 July 3 – WWII: Soviet troops liberate Minsk.
 July 10 – WWII: Soviet troops begin operations to liberate the Baltic countries.
 September 5 – WWII: The Soviet Union declares war on Bulgaria.
 September 6 – WWII: Tartu Offensive in Estonia concludes with Soviet forces capturing Tartu.
 September 19 – WWII: An armistice between Finland and the Soviet Union is signed, ending the Continuation War.
 September 22 – WWII: The Red Army captures Tallinn, Estonia.
 October 9 – WWII: Fourth Moscow Conference: British Prime Minister Winston Churchill and Soviet Premier Joseph Stalin begin a 9-day conference in Moscow to discuss the future of Europe.
 December 14 – Soviet government changes Turkish place names to Russian in the Crimea.
 December 18 –Joseph Stalin celebrates his 66th birthday.

Deaths
 December 13 – Wassily Kandinsky

See also
1944 in fine arts of the Soviet Union
List of Soviet films of 1944
 "1944" (song), a song performed by Jamala

References

 
1940s in the Soviet Union
Years in the Soviet Union
Soviet Union
Soviet Union
Soviet Union